The Ottawa, IL Micropolitan Statistical Area, as defined by the United States Census Bureau, is an area consisting of three counties in north central Illinois, anchored by the city of Ottawa. Peru (until 2020) and Streator (until 2013) are former primary cities.

As of the 2010 census, the μSA had a population of 154,908. An estimate by the Census Bureau, as of July 1, 2012, placed the population at 153,182, a decrease of 1.11%, but still making it the fourth-largest micropolitan statistical area in the United States.

Counties
Bureau
LaSalle
Putnam

Communities

Places with more than 10,000 inhabitants
Ottawa (Principal city)
Streator (partial)

Places with 5,000 to 10,000 inhabitants
LaSalle
Mendota
Princeton
Peru
Spring Valley

Places with 1,000 to 5,000 inhabitants

DePue
Earlville
Granville
Ladd
Marseilles
Oglesby
Seneca (partial)
Sheridan
Walnut
Wenona (partial)
Wyanet

Places with 500 to 1,000 inhabitants

Buda
Cherry
Dalzell
Grand Ridge
Hennepin
La Moille
Leland
Naplate
Neponset
North Utica
Ohio
Sheffield
Tiskilwa
Tonica

Places with less than 500 inhabitants

Arlington
Bureau Junction
Cedar Point
Cherry
Dana
Dover
Hollowayville
Kangley
Leonore
Lostant
Magnolia
Malden
Manlius
Mark
McNabb
Millington (partial)
Mineral
New Bedford
Ransom
Rutland
Seatonville
Somonauk (partial)
Standard
Troy Grove

Unincorporated places

 Altmar
 Baker
 Blakes
 Burnett 
 Catharine
 Clarion 
 Coal Hollow 
 Danway
 Dayton
 Dimmick
 Farm Ridge
 Fitchmoor
 Florid 
 Garfield
 Greenoak 
 Harding 
 Hitt
 Jonesville 
 Kasbeer 
 Kernan 
 Lake Holiday
 Langley 
 Leeds
 Limerick 
 Lone Tree Corners 
 Lowell 
 Marquette 
 Meriden
 Milla
 Milo 
 Moronts
 Mount Palatine
 Normandy 
 Northville
 Norway
 Ottville 
 Peterstown
 Piety Hill 
 Prairie Center 
 Providence 
 Putnam
 Richards
 Rockwell 
 Science
 Serena
 Stavanger 
 Stoneyville 
 Sulphur Springs
 Thomas 
 Ticona
 Tomahawk Bluff 
 Triumph
 Van Orin 
 Vermilionville 
 Walnut Grove
 Waltham
 Webster Park 
 Wedron 
 Wendel 
 Whitefield (partial)
 Wilsman
 Woodland Addition
 Yorktown 
 Zearing

Townships

Bureau County

Arispie Township
Berlin Township
Bureau Township
Clarion Township
Concord Township
Dover Township
Fairfield Township
Gold Township
Greenville Township
Hall Township
Indiantown Township
Lamoille Township
Leepertown Township
Macon Township
Manlius Township
Milo Township
Mineral Township
Neponset Township
Ohio Township
Princeton Township
Selby Township
Walnut Township
Westfield Township
Wheatland Township
Wyanet Township

LaSalle County

Adams Township
Allen Township
Brookfield Township
Bruce Township
Dayton Township
Deer Park Township
Dimmick Township
Eagle Township
Earl Township
Eden Township
Fall River Township
Farm Ridge Township
Freedom Township
Grand Rapids Township
Groveland Township
Hope Township
LaSalle Township
Manlius Township
Mendota Township
Meriden Township
Miller Township
Mission Township
Northville Township
Ophir Township
Osage Township
Ottawa Township
Otter Creek Township
Peru Township
Richland Township
Rutland Township
Serena Township
South Ottawa Township
Troy Grove Township
Utica Township
Vermillion Township
Wallace Township
Waltham Township

Putnam County
Granville Township
Hennepin Township
Magnolia Township
Senachwine Township

Demographics
As of the census of 2000, there were 153,098 people, 60,014 households, and 41,459 families residing within the Micropolitan Area. The racial makeup of the Area was 95.50% White, 1.23% African American, 0.18% Native American, 0.52% Asian, 0.02% Pacific Islander, 1.57% from other races, and 0.99% from two or more races. Hispanic or Latino of any race were 5.01% of the population.

The median income for a household in the Ottawa Micropolitan area was $42,011, and the median income for a family was $49,576. Males had a median income of $38,628 versus $21,706 for females. The per capita income for the area was $19,506.

See also
Illinois statistical areas

Notes

References

 
Geography of Bureau County, Illinois
Geography of LaSalle County, Illinois
Geography of Putnam County, Illinois
Micropolitan areas of Illinois